Cottus aturi, the Adour sculpin or Chabot du Béarn, is a species of freshwater ray-finned fish belonging to the family Cottidae, the typical sculpins. It is found in France and Spain. It inhabits the Adour and Nivelle river drainages. It prefers streams with clear, cool, moderate to swift water and stone substrate. This species was described as a separate species from the European bullhead (C. gobio) in 2005 by Jörg Freyhof, Maurice Kottelat and Arne W. Nolte.

References

Fauna of Spain
Cottus (fish)
Fish described in 2005